The Polynesian starling (Aplonis tabuensis) is a species of starling of the family Sturnidae. It is found in the Samoan Islands, Fiji, Niue, Tonga, the Santa Cruz Islands and Wallis and Futuna. Its natural habitats are subtropical or tropical dry forests and tropical moist forests. Various subspecies exist throughout this wide range, some darker in coloration and some lighter. Its call is a raspy buzz or rattle. Diet is fruit and insects.

On islands where the Samoan starling is present, the Polynesian starling is less conspicuous and keeps to the forest, feeding on harder, less edible fruit.

Gallery

References

Polynesian starling
Birds of the Santa Cruz Islands
Birds of Fiji
Birds of Tonga
Birds of Samoa
Birds of Polynesia
Birds of Niue
Polynesian starling
Polynesian starling
Taxonomy articles created by Polbot